The , also known as the KK Expressway, is a short (2 km) untolled expressway in central Tokyo owned and maintained by Tokyo Skyway Company (Tōkyō Kōsoku Dōro K.K.). It runs in a semicircular loop around the Ginza district of Chūō-ku. The loop is closed by part of the Shuto Expressway Inner Circular Route.

Exit list

Notes
The 0.3 km segment between Shiodome Junction and the Shimbashi exit is technically part of the Shuto Expressway system (designated as part of the Yaesu Route).
The 0.1 km segment between Kyobashi Junction and the Higashi-ginza exit is also part of the Shuto Expressway system and is designated as a branch line of the Inner Circular Route (Planning Route No. 8)

External links
 Official web site 

Expressways in Japan
Two-lane expressways
Ring roads in Japan